Lisa Coleman may refer to:
Lisa Coleman (actress) (born 1970), British actress
Lisa Coleman (musician) (born 1960), American musician
Lisa Ann Coleman (1975–2014), American woman executed in Texas